Gaspeaspis is an extinct genus of placoderm fish, which lived during the Middle Devonian period of North America.

References

Placoderms of North America
Phlyctaeniidae
Middle Devonian animals